Haft Ashian (also Romanized as Haft Āshīān; also known as Haftāsān, Hafteh Shīān, and Haft Shīān) is a village in Agahan Rural District, Kolyai District, Sonqor County, Kermanshah Province, Iran. At the 2006 census, its population was 520, in 112 families.

References 

Populated places in Sonqor County